Hattuşaş (Yozgat) Airport  is a proposed public airport around Deremumlu and Fakıbeyli in Yozgat Province, Turkey. 

The environmental impact report was published in June 2013.

Airport is close to Kababel, Taşpınar, Sarımbey, Fakıbeyli, Deremumlu, Ağcın, İnceçayır, İsafakılı, Kavurgalı, Aşağıkarakaya, Çalatlı, Büyükmahal, Güllük, Garipler, Darıcı, Kışla, Büyüktaşlık, Deremahal, Dişli, Günpınar, Mescitli, Aktaş, İşleğen, Buzağcıoğlu, Dağyenicesi, Köçekkömü, Büyükeynelli, Kızıltepe, Recepli, Babalı, and Bozlar villages.

External links
 http://www.ucuyorum.com/showthread.php?123122-Yozgat-HavalimanÄ±-Projesi&highlight=yozgat
 https://web.archive.org/web/20130714012254/http://www.hitittv.com/Haber/yozgat-havaalani-4-yilda-tamam.html
 http://www.haberler.com/yozgat-havaalanina-kavusuyor-3866807-haberi/

References

Proposed airports in Turkey
Buildings and structures in Yozgat Province